Arrhenia is a genus of fungi in the family Hygrophoraceae. Arrhenia also includes species formerly placed in the genera Leptoglossum and Phaeotellus and the lectotype species itself has an unusual growth form that would not normally be called agaricoid. All of the species grow in association with photosynthetic cryptogams such as mosses, including peat moss, and alga scums on decaying wood, and soil crusts consisting of mixes of such organisms. Typically the fruitbodies of Arrhenia species are grey to black or blackish brown, being pigmented by incrusting melanized pigments on the hyphae.

Etymology

Arrhenia was named for the Swedish botanist Johan Peter Arrhenius.

Species
, Index Fungorum accepts 50 species of Arrhenia:
A. acerosa (Fr.) Kühner 1980 – Europe
A. alnetorum (Singer) Redhead 1984
A. andina (Corner) Redhead, Lutzoni, Moncalvo & Vilgalys 2002
A. antarctica (Singer) Redhead, Lutzoni, Moncalvo & Vilgalys 2002 – Antarctica; South Georgia
A. auriscalpium (Fr.) Fr. 1849 – Antarctica
A. australis  (Cleland) Grgur. 1997
A. baeospora  (Singer) Redhead, Lutzoni, Moncalvo & Vilgalys 2002 – Great Britain
A. chilensis  (Mont.) Redhead, Lutzoni, Moncalvo & Vilgalys 2002
A. chlorocyanea (Pat.) Redhead, Lutzoni, Moncalvo & Vilgalys 2002 – Europe; North America
A. cupuliformis Henn. 1895
A. discorosea (Pilát) Zvyagina, Alexandrova & Bulyonkova 2015
A. eburnea Barrasa & V.J.Rico 2003
A. elegans (Pers.) Redhead, Lutzoni, Moncalvo & Vilgalys 2002
A. epichysium (Pers.) Redhead, Lutzoni, Moncalvo & Vilgalys 2002 – Great Britain
A. fissa (Leyss.) Redhead 1984
A. glauca (Batsch) Bon & Courtec. 1987 
A. griseopallida (Desm.) Watling 1989 – Great Britain
A. hohensis (A.H.Sm.) Redhead, Lutzoni, Moncalvo & Vilgalys 2002
A. latispora (J.Favre) Bon & Courtec. 1987  
A. lobata  (Pers.) Kühner & Lamoure ex Redhead 1984 – Europe
A. lundellii (Pilát) Redhead, Lutzoni, Moncalvo & Vilgalys 2002
A. luteopallida (Kuyper & Hauskn.) Barrasa & V.J.Rico 2003  
A. obatra (J.Favre) Redhead, Lutzoni, Moncalvo & Vilgalys 2002 – Europe
A. obscurata (D.A.Reid) Redhead, Lutzoni, Moncalvo & Vilgalys 2002 – Great Britain 
A. omnivora (Agerer) Redhead, Lutzoni, Moncalvo & Vilgalys 2002 – Antarctica 
A. onisca (Fr.) Redhead, Lutzoni, Moncalvo & Vilgalys 2002 – Europe
A. parvivelutina (Clémençon & Irlet) Redhead, Lutzoni, Moncalvo & Vilgalys 2002
A. pauxilla (Clémençon) Redhead, Lutzoni, Moncalvo & Vilgalys 2002
A. peltigerina  (Peck) Redhead, Lutzoni, Moncalvo & Vilgalys 2002 – Great Britain
A. philonotis (Lasch) Redhead, Lutzoni, Moncalvo & Vilgalys 2002 – Great Britain
A. pubescentipes (H.E.Bigelow) Redhead, Lutzoni, Moncalvo & Vilgalys 2002
A. rainierensis (H.E.Bigelow) Redhead, Lutzoni, Moncalvo & Vilgalys 2002
A. retiruga  (Bull.) Redhead 1984 – Europe
A. rickenii (Hora) Watling 1989 – Europe
A. rigidipes (Lamoure) Redhead, Lutzoni, Moncalvo & Vilgalys 2002
A. rustica  (Fr.) Redhead, Lutzoni, Moncalvo & Vilgalys 2002 – Europe
A. salina (Høil.) Bon & Courtec. 1987
A. spathulata  (Fr.) Redhead 1984 – Europe 
A. sphaerospora (Lamoure) Redhead, Lutzoni, Moncalvo & Vilgalys 2002 
A. sphagnicola (Berk.) Redhead, Lutzoni, Moncalvo & Vilgalys 2002 – Europe
A. stercoraria (Barrasa, Esteve-Rav. & Sánchez Nieto) Redhead, Lutzoni, Moncalvo & Vilgalys 2002 
A. subandina (Singer) P.M.Kirk 2014
A. subglobispora  (G.Moreno, Heykoop & E.Horak) Redhead, Lutzoni, Moncalvo & Vilgalys 2002
A. subobscura (Singer) Redhead, Lutzoni, Moncalvo & Vilgalys 2002
A. tabaresiana (Vila & Llimona) Vila 2009
A. trigonospora (Lamoure) Redhead, Lutzoni, Moncalvo & Vilgalys 2002
A. umbratillis (Fr.) Redhead, Lutzoni, Moncalvo & Vilgalys 2002 – Great Britain
A. velutipes (P.D.Orton) Redhead, Lutzoni, Moncalvo & Vilgalys 2002 – Great Britain
A. violaceoviridis (Courtec.) Courtec. 2008
A. viridimammata (Pilát) Redhead, Lutzoni, Moncalvo & Vilgalys 2002 
A. volkertii (Murrill) Redhead, Lutzoni, Moncalvo & Vilgalys 2002

See also

List of Agaricales genera

References

External links
A. auriscalpium
A. epichysium labelled Omphalina epichysium
A. lobata
A. rickenii
A. spathulata
A. sphagnicola labelled Omphalina sphagnicola

Agaricales genera
Lichen genera
Hygrophoraceae
Taxa named by Elias Magnus Fries
Taxa described in 1849